Fornes Chapel is a chapel of the Church of Norway in Andøy Municipality in Nordland county, Norway.  t is located in the village of Fornes on the island of Hinnøya. It is an annex chapel in the Andøy parish which is part of the Lofoten prosti (deanery) in the Diocese of Sør-Hålogaland. The white, wooden chapel was built in a long church style in 1965. The chapel seats about 120 people.

See also
List of churches in Sør-Hålogaland

References

Andøy
Churches in Nordland
Wooden churches in Norway
20th-century Church of Norway church buildings
Churches completed in 1965
1965 establishments in Norway
Long churches in Norway